The Ven. John Finch Duncan  (born 9 September 1933) was the Archdeacon of Birmingham from 1985 to 2001.

Duncan was educated at Queen Elizabeth Grammar School, Wakefield; University College, Oxford; and Ripon College Cuddesdon. He was ordained in 1960 and was a Curate at St John, South Bank, Middlesbrough from 1959 to 1961; then a Novice with the Society of St Francis. He was a Curate at  St Peter, Birmingham from 1962 to 1965; Chaplain at the University of Birmingham from 1965 to 1976; and Vicar of All Saints, Kings Heath from  1976 to 1985.

References

1933 births
People educated at Queen Elizabeth Grammar School, Wakefield
Alumni of University College, Oxford
Archdeacons of Birmingham
Alumni of Ripon College Cuddesdon
Living people